Big Island Township is one of the fifteen townships of Marion County, Ohio, United States.  The 2010 census found 1,205 people in the township.

Geography
Located in the western part of the county, it borders the following townships:
Salt Rock Township - north
Grand Prairie Township - northeast corner
Marion Township - east
Green Camp Township - south
Bowling Green Township - southwest
Montgomery Township - west
Grand Township - northwest corner

No municipalities are located in Big Island Township.

Name and history
Big Island Township was established in 1823, and named for a tract of forest early settlers believed must have been located on an island. It is the only Big Island Township statewide.

Government
The township is governed by a three-member board of trustees, who are elected in November of odd-numbered years to a four-year term beginning on the following January 1. Two are elected in the year after the presidential election and one is elected in the year before it. There is also an elected township fiscal officer, who serves a four-year term beginning on April 1 of the year after the election, which is held in November of the year before the presidential election. Vacancies in the fiscal officership or on the board of trustees are filled by the remaining trustees.

References

External links
County website

Townships in Marion County, Ohio
Townships in Ohio